Ørjan Nilsen (born 14 June 1982) is a Norwegian producer and DJ ranked inside the Top 250 DJs in his genre by the annual DJ Mag Top 100 poll. His debut studio album In My Opinion was released in 2011, followed by No Saint Out of Me in 2013 and Prism in 2018. 
His discography features collaborations with Armin van Buuren, Cosmic Gate, Fingerling among others.

Musical career

In 2012, Nilsen placed at Number 32 for the DJ Mag Top 100 and was nominated for Best Breakthrough DJ by IDMA.

Forming a bond with Dutch label Armada Music early in his career, his first release on the imprint was "Red Woods", a track put out in 2006 under his DJ Governor alias. Over the years Ørjan found his track, and released singles such as "La Guitarra" (2008), "Lovers Lane" and "So Long Radio" (both 2010).

In 2016, his track "Los Capos" with Colombian producer KhoMha owned the charts for more than four months, preceding his second team-up with superstar Armin van Buuren on "Flashlight". 

The following year saw the release of "Iconic", which was voted #25 in the 2017 A State of Trance Tune of The Year, followed by a series of single releases from aforementioned album Prism. Meanwhile his remix of Loud Luxury's "Body" hit the 5 million streams mark in just a few months.

Radio show / Podcast
Starting from 1'st of April 2020 Ørjan has his own radio show named "In My Opinion Radio".
The show is broadcast live bi-weekly on Ørjan's official Facebook page and YouTube channel at 9PM (CET) and is also available as Podcast.

Awards and nominations
 2012 – Classified No. 32 on DJ Mag Top 100
 2012 – Nominated as Break-Through DJ by IDMA
 2013 – Classified No. 49 on DJ Mag Top 100
 2014 – Classified No. 129 on DJ Mag Top 100
 2018 - Classified No. 247 on DJ Mag Top 100

Discography

Studio albums
 In My Opinion (2011)
 No Saint Out of Me (2013)
Prism (2018)
The Devil Is In The Detail (2019)

Singles

2006
 "Arctic Globe / Prison Break" (Intuition Recordings)
 "Red Woods" (as DJ Governor) (Captivating Sounds)
 "High Pressure" (as DJ SL) (Black Hole Recordings)

2007
 "Lost Once" (Ørjan vs. Octagen)
 "Orlando"
 "Beat Design / Rain" (Ørjan Nilsen pres. O&R)
 "In Fusion / Spawns"
 "Gobstice / Adamantica" (Orion)

2008
 "Black Mamba / Down & Dirty"
 "Scrubs / La Guitarra"

2010
 "Sanctuary / The Odd Number"
 "Lovers Lane"
 "So Long Radio"
 "Shoutbox!"

2011
 "Shades of Grey / Pale Memories" (as DJ Governor)
 "Go Fast!"
 "Mjuzik"
 "Anywhere But Here" (featuring Neev Kennedy)
 "Between the Rays / The Mule"
 "The Music Makers" (with Arnej) 
 "Viking / Atchoo!"

2012
 "Lucky Strike / Legions"
 "Amsterdam"
 "Belter" (with Armin van Buuren) 
 "Endymion"
 "Burana / Filthy Fandango"
 "PhireWorX"
 "Copperfield"

2013
 "No Saint Out of Me"
 "Violetta"
 "Crispy Duck" (with John O'Callaghan) 
 "Drink to Forget (Chill Out Mix)"
 "Xiing"
 "Hands" (with Senadee)
 "In the Air"  (with Adam Young)
 "Fable" (with Fingerling)
 "Mafioso"

2014
 "The Late Anthem" (Way Too Late Mix)
 "Fair Game" (with Cosmic Gate)
 "Hurricane" (feat. Christina Novelli)
 "Apart" (with Jonathan Mendelsohn)
 "W.D.I.A." (with Fingerling)
 "Carioca"
 "Shenanigans"

2015
 "The Edge"
 "Amis Ama"
 "Now We Are talking"
 "Don"
 "Too Early Anthem"
 "What It's All About" (featuring Mike James)

2016
 "Iconic"
 "Los Capos" (vs. KhoMha)
 "Flashlight" (with Armin van Buuren)
 "Kilowatts"

2017
"Renegades" (with Jochen Miller)
"Tradekraft"
"Crowd Control"
"Booya" (with Ruben de Ronde and Rodg)
"The Hardest Part" (with Rykka)
"Swoosh"
"Drowning" (with IDA)
"Hi There Radio"
"Acid Reflux"
"Without Kontakt"

2018
"Million Miles Away"
"Navigator"
"In A Thousand Ways" (featuring Rykka)
"That One Night"
"What a Rush"
"Savour This Moment"
"Love Rush In"

2019
"Wait 4 It"
"Reminiscence"
"Shriek"
"Fomo"
"Badoo"
"The Chosen One"
"Once There Were Raves"
"Don't Need to Know Your Name"
"Kiara"
"1 Like You" (with Fingerling) 
"Samhain"
"Up & Up"

2020
"U Gotta" (with Fingerling)
"Re-Election" (as DJ Governor)
"Instinct"
"Fearless" (with Bobby Rock featuring Anvy)
"Sankthansaften"

2021
"Volt"
"Memoirs" (as DJ Governor)
"Pantheon" (with Mark Sixma)
"Poetry"

2022
"Thousand Drums" (with Ang)
"Jeger"

Remixes

2006
Menno de Jong & Leon Bolier pres. Solar Express – "Magma" (Ørjan & R-Lend's Sequential Mix) 
Galen Behr vs. Hydroid – "Carabella" (Galen Behr vs. Ørjan Nilsen Remix)
O'Callaghan & Kearney – "Exactly" (DJ Governor Remix)

2007
Temple One – "Forever Searching" (Ørjan Nilsen's Synthetic Mix)
 Manual Addicts – "Siberian Dawn" (Ørjan Nilsen Remix)
Conrad S. – "Apologies" (Ørjan Nilsen Remix)
B.E.N. vs. Digital Nature – "Save Me God" (Ørjan Nilsen Remix)

2008
Ørjan Nilsen – "La Guitarra" (Balearic Mix)
Marcus Schössow – "The Last Pluck" (Ørjan Nilsen Remix)
 Ilya Soloviev & Paul Miller – "Lover Summer" (Ørjan Nilsen Remix)
Mike Koglin feat. Tania Laila – "Find Me" (Ørjan Nilsen Vocal Mix)
Rapid Eye – "Circa Forever" (Galen Behr vs. Ørjan Nilsen Remix)

2009
4 Strings feat. LeeMac – "Let Me Take Your Breath Away" (Ørjan Nilsen Remix / Dub)
Will Holland feat. Yana Kay – "Tears In The Rain" (Ørjan Nilsen Remix)
Three Drives – "Automatic City" (Ørjan Nilsen Re-Wiz)
Van Dresen – "Back To Start" (Ørjan Nilsen ReChunk Mix)

2010
Simmons & Blanc – "Whatever It Takes" (Ørjan Nilsen Remix)
Strobe – "Liebe" (Ørjan Nilsen Mix)
Jonas Steur feat. Julie Thompson – "Side By Side" (Ørjan Nilsen Remix)
Gaia – "Aisha" (Ørjan Nilsen Remix)
Adiva – "Desired" (Ørjan Nilsen vs. Mr. Pit Repimp)

2011
Whiteroom feat. Amy Cooper – "Someday" (Ørjan Nilsen Remix)
John O'Callaghan & Timmy & Tommy – "Talk To Me" (Ørjan Nilsen Trance Mix)
Armin van Buuren vs. Ferry Corsten – "Minack" (Ørjan Nilsen SuperChunk Remix)
Tiddey feat. Lyck – "Keep Waiting" (Ørjan Nilsen Midsummernite Remix)
Fingerling – "La Bella" (Ørjan Nilsen Midsummernite Mix)
Mia Dahli – "Need You Now" (Ørjan Nilsen Remix)
Cosmic Gate & Emma Hewitt – "Be Your Sound" (Ørjan Nilsen Remix)
M.I.K.E. – "Back In Time" (Ørjan Nilsen Refix)
Mark Sherry feat. Sharone – "Silent Tears" (Ørjan Nilsen Remix)
Armin van Buuren – "Blue Fear" (Ørjan Nilsen Remix)
Richard Durand feat. Hadley – "Run To You" (Ørjan Nilsen Trance Mix)

2012
BT – "Force Of Gravity" (Ørjan Nilsen Remix)
Christian Burns, Paul Oakenfold & JES – "As We Collide" (Ørjan Nilsen Remix)
Dead Can Dance – "The Host Of Seraphim" (Ørjan Nilsen's ASOT 500 Intro Bootleg)

2013
Armin van Buuren & Markus Schulz – "The Expedition (A State of Trance 600 Anthem)" (Ørjan Nilsen Remix)
Push – "Universal Nation" (Ørjan Nilsen Remix)
Armin van Buuren feat. Lauren Evans – "Alone" (Ørjan Nilsen Remix)

2014
Audien feat. Michael S. – "Leaving You" (Ørjan Nilsen Remix)

2015
Andrew Rayel feat. Cindy Alma – "Hold One To Your Love" (Ørjan Nilsen Remix)

2016
Armin van Buuren feat. Cimo Fränkel – "Strong Ones" (Ørjan Nilsen Remix)

2018
Firebeatz feat. Vertel – "Till The Sun Comes Up" (Ørjan Nilsen Remix)
Loud Luxury feat. Brando – "Body" (Ørjan Nilsen Remix)
Lost Frequencies feat. The NGHBRS – "Like I Love You" (Ørjan Nilsen Remix)

2019
Orjan Nilsen x Dennis Sheperd x Nifra x Estiva – "Cabin Fever" (Ørjan Nilsen Club Mix)

2020
BLR feat. NBLM – "Take Me Higher" (Ørjan Nilsen Remix)
Tyron Dixon feat. Kris Kiss – "Destination" (Ørjan Nilsen Remix)
Morgan Page & Mark Sixma – "Our Song" (Ørjan Nilsen Remix)

2021
Orjan Nilsen – "Between The Rays" (Ørjan Nilsen presents DJ Governor Remix)
Jarod Glawe – "Falling (feat. Natalie Major)"  (Ørjan Nilsen Remix)

References

External links
 

1982 births
Living people
Norwegian DJs
Armada Music artists
People from Sør-Varanger
Norwegian trance musicians
Norwegian house musicians
Electronic dance music DJs